Kadavu may refer to:

 Kadavu Island, the fourth largest island in Fiji
 Kadavu Group, an archipelago in Fiji including Kadavu Island
 Kadavu Province, a province of Fiji including Kadavu Group
 Kadavu Airport or Vunisea Airport, an airport on Kadavu Island
 Kadavu (Fijian Communal Constituency, Fiji), a former electoral division of Fiji
 Kadavu (film) (English: The Ferry), a 1991 Indian Malayalam film